Kitsch, applied to art and design, means naïve imitation, overly eccentric, gratuitous or of banal taste.

Kitsch may also refer to:

Kitsch (magazine), produced by students of Cornell University
Taylor Kitsch (born 1981), Canadian actor and model
"Kitsch", a 1970 song by Barry Ryan

See also